The 2022 Virginia Tech Hokies football team represented Virginia Tech during the 2022 NCAA Division I FBS football season. The Hokies were led by first-year head coach Brent Pry. They played their home games at Lane Stadium in Blacksburg, Virginia, competing as members of the Atlantic Coast Conference (ACC).

Previous season 
The Hokies finished the 2021 season 6–7, 4–4 in ACC play to finish in a tie for third place in the Coastal division. They received an invitation to the 2021 Pinstripe Bowl where they lost to Maryland 54–10.

On November 16, 2021, the school fired head coach Justin Fuente after six years as head coach. Assistant coach J. C. Price was named the interim coach and coached the Hokies in the Pinstripe Bowl. On November 30, the school named Penn State defensive coordinator Brent Pry the team's new head coach.

Schedule

Game summaries

at Old Dominion

Boston College

Wofford

West Virginia

at North Carolina

at Pittsburgh

Miami

at No. 24 NC State

Georgia Tech

at Duke

at Liberty

Virginia (Canceled)

Roster

Coaching staff

References

Virginia Tech
Virginia Tech Hokies football seasons
Virginia Tech Hokies football